Eumannia oppositaria, the bordered dusky carpet, is a moth of the  family Geometridae. It is found in Slovenia, Ukraine, Romania, Bulgaria, North Macedonia, Albania, Greece and Turkey. It has also been recorded from Israel and North Africa.

The wingspan is 17–19 mm. Adults are on wing in July and August.

The larvae feed on Quercus, Crataegus and Prunus species.

Subspecies
Eumannia oppositaria oppositaria
Eumannia oppositaria syriaca (Turati & Kruger, 1936) (Libya)

References

Moths described in 1864
Boarmiini
Moths of Europe
Moths of Asia